This is a list of members of the South Australian Legislative Council from 1869 to 1873.

This was the fourth Legislative Council to be elected under the Constitution of 1856, which provided for a house consisting of eighteen members to be elected from the whole colony acting as one electoral district "The Province"; that six members, selected by lot, should be replaced at General Elections after four years, another six to be replaced four years later and thenceforth each member should have a term of twelve years.

Seven seats were contested – six by the "effluxion of time" (Baker, Barrow, Elder, English, Everard and Peacock) and one to replace Charles Hervey Bagot, who resigned the previous December.

References
Parliament of South Australia — Statistical Record of the Legislature

Members of South Australian parliaments by term
19th-century Australian politicians